Piero Carnabuci (6 September 1893 – 13 February 1958) was an Italian stage and film actor.

Life and career 
Born in Santa Teresa di Riva, Messina, after the World War I Carnabuci decided to abandon his engineering studies at the University of Catania to pursue an acting career. He made his stage debut in 1920, with the company held by Luigi Chiarini and Olga Vittoria Gentilli, and almost immediately he became one of the most requested young actors in the Italian theatre of the time. Notably, between 1926 and 1928 he was  first actor in the stage company of Luigi Pirandello, and between 1928 and 1929 he was first actor in the company of Sem Benelli. Carnabuci was also active in films, even if mainly cast in supporting roles. He died of coronary thrombosis in his house in Milan, aged 64, a few weeks  after being struck by a severe bronchopneumonia.

Selected filmography 
 
 Kif Tebbi (1928)
 Creatures of the Night (1934)
 The Black Corsair (1937)
 Scipio Africanus: The Defeat of Hannibal (1937)
 The Sinner (1940)
 Princess Cinderella (1941)
 I Live as I Please (1942)
 The Gorgon (1942)
 The Jester's Supper (1942)
 The Whole City Sings (1945)
 The Mistress of Treves (1952)
 The Woman Who Invented Love (1952)
 Andrea Chénier (1955)

References

External links 
 
 
 

1893 births
1958 deaths
20th-century Italian male actors
Italian male film actors
Italian male television actors
Italian male stage actors
Actors from the Province of Messina
University of Catania alumni